Courtney Fortune is an American singer-songwriter from Seattle, Washington.

Fortune is a singer, songwriter, coach and entrepreneur. She has been recognized by the John Lennon Foundation, Glamour and Genlux magazine as "America's Next Big Jazz Singer", and has written and performed songs for Atlantic Records, Universal Music Group, Sony Japan, Disney, Cartoon Network, MTV and ABC. She received the Brian Wilson Musical Achievement Award for her work in the songwriting field and earned her Bachelor of Science degree in Music Industry from the University of Southern California.

Fortune performs with jazz pianist David Benoit and co-hosts the Jazz Eclectic Concert Series, TJE Music Festival and radio hour on 91.5 FM Las Vegas. Her EP You Make It Easy was recorded at Capitol Studios in Los Angeles and produced by Chris Walden.

She is the founder of Songmaker Sessions, songwriting and recording workshops for teens and adults which aims to help young songwriters improve their skills and confidence.

Discography
 Speak Love (Origin, 2009)
 You Make It Easy (2019)

References

External links
Official website

Living people
Year of birth missing (living people)
People from Bellingham, Washington
Singer-songwriters from Washington (state)
American women singer-songwriters
American jazz singers
American women jazz singers
Jazz musicians from Washington (state)
21st-century American women